Bugata Venkata Subba Rao, better known as B. A. Subba Rao (died 1987), was an Indian film director and producer who predominantly worked in Telugu cinema. He is recipient of Raghupathi Venkaiah Award for his lifetime contribution to Telugu cinema.

He started his career in 1950 with Palletoori Pilla as writer, director and producer. He gave N. T. Rama Rao the first chance as a lead actor in this film. It was a minor commercial hit and both Subba Rao and Rama Rao gained a good reputation from it.

He has produced some films like Raju Peda (1954), Chenchu Lakshmi (1958), and Bhishma (1962) under the banner of B. A. S. Productions.

He made Raju Peda in 1954 with N. T. Rama Rao and Sudhakar in lead roles. It is a remake of the novel by Mark Twain and Hollywood movie The Prince and the Pauper. When N. T. Rama Rao became the Chief Minister of Andhra Pradesh, he made Subba Rao the Chairman of the AP Film Development Corporation.

Filmography
 Palletoori Pilla in 1950 (writer, producer, and director)
 Tingu Ranga in 1952 (producer and director)
 Aada Bratuku in 1952 (director)
 Shyamala in 1952 (director)
 Raju Peda in 1954 (producer and director) Filmfare Best Film Award (Telugu)
 Palle Paduchu in 1954 (director)
 Rani Ratnaprabha in 1955 (producer and director)
 Chenchu Lakshmi in 1958 (producer and Director)
 Sahodari in 1959 (director)
 Bhishma in 1962 (producer and director)
 Marmayogi in 1964 (director)
 Mohini Bhasmasura in 1966 (producer and director)
 Pedda Akkayya in 1967 (director)
 Bhale Tammudu in 1969 (director)
 Raitu Bidda in 1971 (director)
 Sati Anasuya in 1971 (director)
 Ram Raheem in 1974
 Moguda? Pellama? in 1975
 Sati Savitri in 1978 (director)
 Maavari Manchitanam in 1979 (director)
 Mugana Sedu in 1980 (director)
 Thayiya Madilalli in 1981 (director)
 Thayi Mamathe in 1985 (director)
 Yella Hengasirinda in 1986
 Thavarumane Udugore in 1991
 Mangalya in 1991

See also
 Raghupathi Venkaiah Award

References

External links
 B. A. Subba Rao at IMDb.
 Photograph of B. A. Subba Rao at Legends in Telugu Film Industry.

Telugu film directors
1987 deaths
Telugu film producers
Year of birth missing
20th-century Indian film directors